Here is a list of Anandalok Awards - Best Films Award.

See also

 Anandalok Awards
 Tollywood Bangla

Anandalok Puraskar
Awards for best film